Series 29 of University Challenge began on 13 September 1999, with the final on 9 May 2000.

Results
 Winning teams are highlighted in bold.
 Teams with green scores (winners) returned in the next round, while those with red scores (losers) were eliminated.
 Teams with orange scores have lost, but survived as the first round losers with the highest losing scores.
 A score in italics indicates a match decided on a tie-breaker question.
 A score in brown indicates third place.

First round

Highest Scoring Losers Playoffs

Second round

Quarterfinals

Semifinals

Final

 The trophy and title were awarded to the Durham team comprising John Stewart, Nick Allan, Nick Ledger and Colin Telfer.
 The trophy was presented by Jeremy Paxman.

References

External links
 University Challenge Homepage
 Blanchflower Results Table

1999
1999 British television seasons
2000 British television seasons